24 Ursae Majoris is a variable star in the northern circumpolar constellation of Ursa Major, located 101.5 light-years from the Sun. It has the variable star designation DK Ursae Majoris and the Bayer designation d Ursae Majoris; 24 Ursae Majoris is the Flamsteed designation. This object is visible to the naked eye as a faint, yellow-hued star with an apparent visual magnitude of 4.54.

Description
24 Ursae Majoris  has a stellar classification of G4 III-IV, which, at the estimated age of about one billion years, matches the spectrum of an aging giant star blended with features of a subgiant luminosity class. Based upon its position on the H–R diagram, this star has just passed through the Hertzsprung gap and is ready to begin its first ascent along the red-giant branch. It is a suspected RS Canum Venaticorum variable that changes in brightness by up to 0.058 in magnitude. Periods of 22.08 and 2.115 hours have been reported.

This star has 1.9 times the mass of the Sun and has expanded to 4.6 times the Sun's radius. It is spinning with a rotation period of 10 days. The star is radiating 14.9 times the Sun's luminosity from its enlarged photosphere at an effective temperature of 5,335 K.

Nomenclature
With π1, π2, σ1, σ2, ρ and 2 Ursae Majoris, it composed the Arabic asterism Al Ṭhibā᾽, the Gazelle. According to the catalogue of stars in the Technical Memorandum 33-507 - A Reduced Star Catalog Containing 537 Named Stars, Al Ṭhibā were the title for seven stars : 2 Ursae Majoris as Althiba I, π1 as Althiba II, π2 as Althiba III, ρ as Althiba IV, σ1 as Althiba V, σ2 as Althiba VI, and this star (d) as Althiba VII.

References

G-type giants
RS Canum Venaticorum variables
Ursa Major (constellation)
Ursae Majoris, d
Durchmusterung objects
Ursae Majoris, 24
082210
046977
3771
Ursae Majoris, DK
Althiba VII